Steilshoop is a quarter of Hamburg, Germany in the Wandsbek borough.

References 

Quarters of Hamburg
Wandsbek